Andrej Pečnik (born 27 September 1981) is a Slovenian former professional footballer who played as a defender.

International career
Pečnik played 4 times for the Slovenia national team between 2005 and 2006.

Personal life
He is the brother of Nejc Pečnik.

Honours
Slovan Bratislava
Corgoň liga: 2010–11
Slovak Cup: 2010–11

References

External links
 
 

1981 births
Living people
Association football defenders
Slovenian footballers
Slovenia international footballers
Slovenian PrvaLiga players
NK Dravograd players
NK Celje players
Slovenian expatriate footballers
Czech First League players
SK Sigma Olomouc players
Expatriate footballers in the Czech Republic
Slovenian expatriate sportspeople in the Czech Republic
NK Maribor players
Expatriate footballers in Romania
Slovenian expatriate sportspeople in Romania
Liga I players
FC Politehnica Iași (1945) players
Slovak Super Liga players
ŠK Slovan Bratislava players
Expatriate footballers in Slovakia
Slovenian expatriate sportspeople in Slovakia
FC Volgar Astrakhan players
Expatriate footballers in Russia
Slovenian expatriate sportspeople in Russia
Expatriate footballers in Austria
Slovenian expatriate sportspeople in Austria
People from Dravograd